Live at the Marquee is a live album by the band King Crimson, released through the King Crimson Collectors' Club in October 1998.

Track listing
"21st Century Schizoid Man" (Robert Fripp, Michael Giles, Greg Lake, Ian McDonald, Peter Sinfield) – 6:22
"Drop In" (Fripp, Giles, Lake, McDonald) – 5:42
"I Talk to the Wind" (McDonald, Sinfield) – 5:18
"Epitaph" (Fripp, Giles, Lake, McDonald, Sinfield) – 3:20
"Mantra" [not listed] (Fripp, Giles, Lake, McDonald) – 7:33
"Travel Weary Capricorn" (Fripp, Giles, Lake, McDonald, Sinfield) – 3:33
"Improv" (Fripp, Giles, Lake, McDonald) – 12:29
including "Nola" (Felix Arndt) and "Étude No 7" (Matteo Carcassi)
"Mars" (Gustav Holst, arr. by Fripp, Giles, Lake, McDonald) – 8:30
"Trees" (Fripp, Giles, Lake, McDonald, Sinfield) – 18:44

Personnel
Robert Fripp – guitar
Greg Lake – bass guitar, vocals
Ian McDonald – woodwinds, keyboards, Mellotron, vocals
Michael Giles – drums, percussion, vocals
Peter Sinfield – illumination

References

1998 live albums
King Crimson Collector's Club albums
Live albums recorded at The Marquee Club